Lauren J. Faust (born July 25, 1974) is an American animator, writer, voice director, and storyboard artist, best known as the creator of the animated series My Little Pony: Friendship Is Magic and DC Super Hero Girls. Faust has collaborated with her husband Craig McCracken on his four animated series The Powerpuff Girls, Foster's Home for Imaginary Friends, Wander Over Yonder, and Kid Cosmic.

Career
Faust attended the California Institute of Arts from 1992 to 1994. She started working in the animation industry as a character layouts artist for the character Julie from the MTV animated television series The Maxx, before becoming an animator at Turner Feature Animation and Warner Bros Feature Animation, where she worked as an animator on feature films such as Cats Don't Dance, Quest for Camelot, and The Iron Giant.

Faust shifted to television animation in 1999, working on The Powerpuff Girls and Foster's Home for Imaginary Friends at Cartoon Network Studios as a storyboard artist, screenwriter, supervising producer, story supervisor. Faust created and developed the toy line Milky Way and the Galaxy Girls.

Faust worked with Hasbro to develop the company's My Little Pony property, resulting in the series My Little Pony: Friendship Is Magic. The series proved to be a major success not only with the primary young audience, but also significantly among adults and teenagers, who became popularly known as "bronies". She developed Super Best Friends Forever for Warner Brothers, and Medusa for Sony Pictures Animation, though Sony changed the creative direction of Medusa, with Faust leaving the project.  She worked with her husband Craig McCracken on Wander Over Yonder for Disney and Kid Cosmic for Netflix.

Faust worked with Warner Bros. in 2019 to develop a reboot of DC Super Hero Girls. As of 2021, she was developing an animated series for Netflix Animation, called Toil & Trouble. However, the series was cancelled by August of that year due to a change in leadership. Faust mentioned in April 2022 that she managed to retain the rights to the show, and was hoping some other network would pick it up eventually.

Awards
In 2004, Faust was nominated for an Emmy Award. In 2005, she was nominated for an Annie Award. In 2009, she shared a Primetime Emmy for the Foster's Home for Imaginary Friends special, "Destination: Imagination".

Personal life

Faust is married to Craig McCracken, creator of The Powerpuff Girls, Foster's Home for Imaginary Friends, and Wander Over Yonder. They met while they were working on the third season of The Powerpuff Girls. Faust has worked with her husband on all of his shows. She considers herself a lifelong feminist. Faust took maternity leave in mid-2016 to take care of her newborn daughter.

Filmography

Films

Television

Video games

References

Further reading
 Liz Ohanesian, "Lauren Faust: Let's Hear It for the Girls", LA Weekly People 2012 issue,

External links

 
 
 
  (2021, unsupported flash animation)
 Lauren Faust interview

1974 births
Living people
21st-century American screenwriters
21st-century American women writers
Animators from California
American film producers
American storyboard artists
American television directors
Television producers from California
American television writers
American voice directors
American women screenwriters
California Institute of the Arts alumni
Primetime Emmy Award winners
Showrunners
American women animators
American women television directors
American women television producers
American women television writers
Writers from San Jose, California
Screenwriters from California
American women film producers
American animated film directors
American animated film producers
Cartoon Network Studios people
American feminists